James H. Suttle (born June 13, 1944) is an American corporate executive, engineer, and politician who served as the 50th mayor of Omaha, Nebraska from 2009 to 2013.

Earlier career
Suttle held the position of vice-chair of the Board of Directors for the Omaha-based engineering and design firm HDR, Inc.  He also served as executive vice president and director of corporate development for HDR. He is a licensed professional engineer in Nebraska and has served as a member and chairman of the Nebraska Board of Engineers and Architects .

Public service

In 2005, Suttle was elected to represent District 1 on the Omaha City Council. As a councilman, he served on the board of the Metropolitan Area Planning Agency and as a member of the Omaha-Douglas Building Commission. Suttle previously served as Public Works Director for the City of Omaha, and once held transportation planning positions with local governments in Albuquerque, New Mexico and Wichita, Kansas.

Four council members, led by Frank Brown, voted to strip $200,000 from a project backed by Suttle to create another streetscape in Florence, moving the funds to another project. The vote marked the first time in several years that Omaha City Council members had agreed to take away funds from another member's district.

On November 24, 2008, Jim Suttle announced his candidacy for Mayor of Omaha.

On April 7, 2009, in the nonpartisan mayoral primary, Suttle finished second to former Mayor Hal Daub. The two went on to the general election on May 12, 2009 and Suttle was elected Mayor of Omaha.

Recall election
In late 2010 the movement to recall Suttle had been gathering signatures to recall him. One of the arguments against the recall is that it would cost 600,000 to 900,000 dollars. 37,219 unvalidated Signatures were handed in at 3 p.m on November 19, 2010, 10,000 more than needed. 26,643 valid names were required.

The recall election happened on January 25, 2011. Suttle defeated the attempt to recall him in a close result with those voting "NO" to the recall 38,841, and those voting "YES" to the recall 37,198. Suttle 51.1 percent to the recallers 48.9 percent.
Accusations were made against Forward Omaha, an Anti-Recall campaign organization regarding people who were transported to the Election Commission Office to vote, and then to a campaign worker training where they were paid for their time. A member of the opposing side was charged with faking eight signatures on the recall petition. Upon investigation, the Nebraska State Patrol reported that, although poor judgment was involved, there was no wrongdoing from the leaders of either group. Prosecutions in either investigation would not have invalidated the election.

References

External links 

Jim Suttle

Nebraska Democrats
Omaha City Council members
Mayors of Omaha, Nebraska
Living people
1940s births
People from Morrison, Colorado
West Virginia University alumni